The Piano Quintet No. 1 in A major, Op. 5 (B. 28), is a piano quintet by Antonín Dvořák, scored for two violins, viola, cello and piano. Composed in 1872 in Prague, it was premiered in November that year. It was not published then and Dvořák lost the autograph over the years, having to ask a friend for a copy when he revised the work in 1887. The revised version was not performed until 1922, 18 years after his death.

Structure 
The composition consists of three movements:

A typical performance takes approximately 28 minutes.

References

External links 
 

1872 compositions
Compositions in A major
Piano quintets by Antonín Dvořák